The Caudron C.27 was a French biplane, a two-seat basic trainer which also competed successfully in the 1920s.

Design and development

When it was shown at the 1922 Paris Salon, the C.27 was presented as the second in a triplet of increasingly demanding trainers, starting with the Caudron G.3 and ending with the more powerful Caudron C.59, though Hauet describes it as a basic trainer.

It was a two bay biplane, without stagger or significant dihedral. It had rectangular plan wings, each built around two wooden spars and fabric covered. These were braced with parallel interplane struts, assisted by piano-wire bracing. There were simple parallel cabane struts between the upper wing centre section and the upper fuselage longerons. Ailerons were fitted only to the upper wing.

The C.27 was powered by an  Le Rhône 9C nine cylinder air-cooled rotary engine, driving a two blade propeller and with a cowling which surrounded its upper three-quarters. Behind the engine the fuselage had a cross-braced beam structure. The open cockpits were in tandem between the wings, the pupil's slightly forward of mid-chord and the instructor's close behind under the trailing edge, which had a rounded cut-out to improve his vision. At the rear a long, shallow triangular fin carried a straight edged balanced rudder which reached down to the keel. The tailplane was mounted on top of the fuselage and the elevators were cut away centrally to allow rudder movement. The C.27 had a fixed tail skid undercarriage with its wheels on a single axle supported by two pairs of V-struts from the lower fuselage. The forward members of these were originally double with a shock absorber in their upper parts, together with an elaborately wire braced central skid to prevent nose-overs, but the skid was soon abandoned and the double struts replaced by single ones.

At least one C.27 flew with a  Anzani engine. The name C.27 was used to at least mid-1924 but at the Paris Salon L'Aérophile noted that the designation had changed to C.127. From 1925 several were fitted with  Clerget 9B nine cylinder rotary engines and designated C.125.

The C.128 was again very similar but powered by a  Salmson 9AC, a nine-cylinder, air cooled radial engine. This had a smaller diameter than the rotaries and was mounted in a tapered nose with its cylinders exposed. There was a 14% increase in empty weight from the C.127 and a slight increase in span and area. At least five were built or converted.

At least twenty-one C.27, C.125, C.127 and C.128 aircraft appeared on the French civil register.

Operational history

The exact date of the first flight, piloted by Boulard, is not known but the aircraft was flown publicly at Orly at the end of June 1922. It was piloted by Thoret, who particularly impressed onlookers with a polished aerobatic performance, the last part with his engine off.  Two years later a C.27 piloted by Patin won the 1924 Zenith Cup, a trophy based on fuel consumption and load carrying ability, and Adrienne Bolland set a women's record in another C.27 when she completed 212 consecutive loops.

A C.128 came second in the 1926 Zenith Cup and in September 1927 one carried five people to win a competition at a rally in Auvergne. In September 1927 a C.128 won a prize by carrying five people. The flight was organised by Le Peit Paisien newspaper and by Paramount films, for whom Cohendy recorded their journey. It was the first flight from France to the Cape.

In 1930 a modified C.128, ordered by the Société Pour le Développement de l'Aviation (Society for the development of aviation) and designated C.128/2 was equipped to allow an acrobat to hang on a trapeze under the aircraft and also to permit wing-walking.

Variants

C.27 Original aircraft with  Le Rhône 9C.  Anzani engines were also fitted.
C.125 As C.27/127 but with  Clerget 9B engine.
C.127 Original type redesignated with only minor changes, same Le Rhône 9C engine.
C.128 As C.27/127 but with  Salmson 9AC engine and greater span. Some were three seaters, with a third cockpit a little further aft.

Specifications (C.127)

References

C.027
1920s French sport aircraft
Biplanes
Single-engined tractor aircraft
Aircraft first flown in 1922
Rotary-engined aircraft